Simoselaps, or Australian coral snakes, is a genus composed of 12 species of venomous elapid snakes.

Geographic range
Species of the genus Simoselaps are found throughout Australia.

Description
Australian coral snakes are small snakes. They have smooth and polished scales, shovel-shaped snouts, and are brightly marked with bands or annuli.

Habitat and behavior
Species of Simoselaps are found mainly in arid regions. They are burrowing snakes which move beneath the surface through loose sand or soil. At night they come to the surface to feed on small lizards and reptile eggs.

Reproduction
All species of Australian coral snakes are oviparous and lay clutches of three to five eggs.

Species

Several of the above species are sometimes placed in the genera Brachyurophis or Neelaps.

References

Further reading
Cogger HG (2000). Reptiles and Amphibians of Australia, Sixth Edition. Sanibel Island, Florida: Ralph Curtis Publishing. 808 pp.
Horner P (1998). "Simoselaps morrisi sp. nov. (Elapidae), a new species of snake of the Northern Territory". The Beagle 14: 63–70.
Jan [G] (1859). "Plan d'une Iconographie descriptive des Ophidiens et Description sommaire de nouvelles espèces de Serpents ". Revue et Magasin de Zoologie Pure et Apliquée, Paris, Series 2, 11: 122–130. (Simoselaps, new subgenus, p. 123). (in French).
Storr GM (1978). "Taxonomic notes on the reptiles of the Shark Bay region, Western Australia". Records of the Western Australian Museum 6 (3): 303–318.

External links

 
Snake genera
Taxa named by Giorgio Jan
Taxonomy articles created by Polbot
Snakes of Australia